As was the custom since 1930, the 1950 Tour de France was contested by national and regional teams.  The three major cycling countries in 1950, Italy, Belgium and France, each sent a team of 10 cyclists.  Other countries sent teams of 6 cyclists: Switzerland, Luxembourg and the Netherlands.  Italy and Belgium also sent two extra teams of young riders of 6 cyclists each.  The French regional cyclists were divided into five teams of 10 cyclists: Paris, Ile de France–North East, West, Centre–South West and South East.  Originally, the plan was to have one extra international team of six cyclists with Spanish cyclists, but this extra team became a North African team, with Moroccan and Algerian cyclists, both being French colonies at the time.  Altogether this made 116 cyclists.  There were 60 French cyclists (of which 2 French-Moroccan and 4 French-Algerian), 22 Italian, 16 Belgian, 6 Dutch, 6 Luxembourg and 6 Swiss cyclists.

The winner of the previous Tour de France, Fausto Coppi, was injured during the 1950 Giro d'Italia, so he could not defend his title.  Still the Italians were favourites, especially Gino Bartali, who had come second in the 1950 Giro d'Italia behind Hugo Koblet, who did not enter the 1950 Tour de France.  Other candidates for the victory were Bobet, Kübler, Ockers and Geminiani.  Two days before the Tour started, the organisation held a poll amongst 25 journalists, who each gave their eight favourites for the victory.  Bartali was on the most lists, 23. Robic was written on 20 lists, Lauredi on 19, Bobet and Goldschmidt on 17.   On the first day of the race, before the Tour had started, French cyclist Charles Coste was replaced by Paul Giguet.

Start list

By team

By rider

By nationality

References

1950 Tour de France
1950